Louis Richard may refer to:

 Louis Claude Richard (1754–1821), French botanist and botanical illustrator
 Louis Richard (footballer)
 Louis Richard (politician) (1817–1876), businessman and politician in Quebec, Canada
 Louis Paul Émile Richard (1795–1849), French mathematician